Anna Svärd is a 1928 novel by the Swedish writer Selma Lagerlöf. It is the last installment in Lagerlöf's Ring trilogy, where it follows The Löwensköld Ring and Charlotte Löwensköld.

Anna Svärd was first translated into English by Velma Swanston Howard under the original title, and so published by Doubleday, Doran in 1931 as part of its edition of the trilogy under the title The Ring of the Löwenskölds.

Plot
Karl-Artur like most of the priests loves God deeply, but he doesn´t have much people skills. In this part of the series he gets involved with  Anna Svärd, an indecisive sales agent. After breaking up abruptly with Charlotte, Karl's only intentions are to find a woman to help him pay his bill and forget about poverty for good. On the other hand, Anna is eager to marry anyone to have a better life. But the unimaginable occurs - Thea's return gives the story a grotesque spin.

See also
 1928 in literature
 Swedish literature

References

External links
 Anna Svärd at LibraryThing.com

1928 Swedish novels
Novels by Selma Lagerlöf
Albert Bonniers Förlag books
Swedish-language novels